Farrah Rachael Forke (January 12, 1968 – February 25, 2022) was an American actress known for her roles as Alex Lambert on the NBC sitcom Wings, and Mayson Drake on Lois and Clark: The New Adventures of Superman. She also voiced the character Big Barda on the animated television series Batman Beyond and Justice League Unlimited.

Early life
Forke was born in Corpus Christi, Texas, on January 12, 1968.  She was one of two children of Chuck Forke and Beverly (Mendleski).  Forke was named after Farrah Fawcett, who was a family friend. In an interview, she said: "I was a huge fan of hers, thinking as a child 'If she can do it so can I.'"  She attended the Hockaday School, an all-girls private school in Dallas, where she was a cheerleader.  She started acting with a role in a Texas production of the musical The Rocky Horror Show.  After graduating from high school, she relocated to New York City in 1989 to study acting at the Lee Strasberg Institute. She also worked as a bartender while studying in the city.

Career
Forke made her feature debut in the 1991 film Brain Twisters (1991).

Wings 
She became best known as Alex Lambert for two seasons on the NBC sitcom Wings. Only her second professional acting role, it became one of her biggest roles.

She said she was nervous during the early episodes. "I was so green and so nervous," she said. "There were so many people around, and four cameras. My hands used to shake in the early episodes. You'll see me holding coffee cups with both hands to control the shaking." She drew on personal experience to play the character, who was not at all like the actress. "I am really nothing like her," she said in an interview, "but the toughness I got to display as a real bartender in New York at closing time prepared me for the role of Alex. I would lower the tone of my voice to show I meant business and I used that in my audition. I knew I could play her."

Overall, the part taught the young actress a lot. "It was a great learning experience. I learned so much, especially from Steven Weber and Tony Shaloub." The part was a recurring role during the 1992–93 season, the fourth season of the show, and a regular cast role the following year, the fifth season.

Forke was upset not to be asked back for the sixth season as a regular cast member. The writers found the Alex character difficult to write for and felt they had run out of stories for the character and wanted to explore her onscreen boyfriend Brian's (played by Weber) single life instead. Forke was asked back for a guest appearance in one episode of the sixth season, which gave a conclusion to her character.

Post-Wings, Lois & Clark, Justice League and other roles 
After Wings, Forke played Carey, an office manager for a computer software company, in the 1995 CBS sitcom Dweebs (1995), and then, from 1996 to 1997, a prep school teacher in NBC's Mr. Rhodes.  She also appeared on Ned and Stacey with her Wings castmate Thomas Haden Church.  Forke was the voice woman of several companies, such as Arby's, Cadillac, Checkers, and Vanderbilt.

Forke had a recurring role on Lois and Clark as Mayson Drake, an attorney who considers Superman a vigilante, but holds a candle for Clark Kent. 

Forke would once again take part in the Superman universe by voicing the character Big Barda in two episodes of Batman Beyond and one episode of Justice League Unlimited, animated shows set in the same universe as Superman: The Animated Series.

In films, she featured in Academy Award winner Barry Levinson's Disclosure (1994), Michael Mann's Heat (1995), and Ground Control (1998).  She appeared in Kate's Addiction (1998), in which she and actress Kari Wuhrer play women in a lesbian love affair, as well as the TV-movies Nurses on the Line: The Crash of Flight 7 (CBS, 1993) with Lindsay Wagner. Other TV movie roles include Journey to the Center of the Earth (NBC, 1993), Complex of Fear (CBS, 1993), Bionic Ever After? (CBS, 1994) (again with Wagner), and Abandoned and Deceived (ABC, 1995).

Her final onscreen role was in the 2001 movie It Is What It Is directed by Billy Frolick. Forke was very proud of the role. "It's by far the best work I've ever done," she said in a 2003 interview. She also served as executive producer on the movie. Around the time of the 2003 interview, she moved to New Mexico and, though mentioned she was planning to return to LA for pilot season, seemingly decided to retire permanently from acting, later moving back to Texas. She would later say: "I have no plans to return to Hollywood. I love my life here in Texas, raising my twin boys. Life is good." She had one more role, a voice role, in 2005, resuming her voice work as Big Barda in Justice League Unlimited.

Personal life
Forke underwent plastic surgery in 1989, when she was 21, to receive silicone breast implants.  However, the implants later ruptured and caused her health complications.  She consequently had them removed four years later in February 1993.  She then filed a lawsuit in Houston on March 24 of the following year against Dow Corning, the Dow Chemical Company, the Inamed Corporation and the McGhan Corporation.

She was dear friends with actress Caroline Aaron, who played Mary Pat Lee on Wings. The two featured together in Forke's last episode of the series.

Forke met Mark Layton Brown while he was working in the art department of Wings.  Together, they had two children: twin sons Chuck and Wit.  She took a hiatus from acting during the mid-2000s and returned to Texas to raise her children, eventually deciding the hiatus would become a permanent retirement from Hollywood.

Death 
Forke died at her home in Houston, Texas, on February 25, 2022, at the age of 54. She had been battling cancer in the years leading up to her death.

Many tributes were paid to her, including from her cast mate Steven Weber, who played her onscreen boyfriend Brian in Wings, saying: "She was every bit as tough, fun, beautiful and grounded as her character “Alex” on Wings."

Filmography

References

External links

Turner Classic Movies: Farrah Forke

1968 births
2022 deaths
20th-century American actresses
21st-century American actresses
Actresses from Texas
American television actresses
Deaths from cancer in Texas
Hockaday School alumni
People from Corpus Christi, Texas